Vladislav Grigorievich Davidzon (born 7 March 1985) is an artist, writer, editor and publisher, best known for his journalism and chronicling on post-Soviet politics with an emphasis on cultural affairs. Davidzon is the former publisher and editor-in-chief of The Odessa Review, an anglophone publication that focused on the cultural life of Odessa, Ukraine. Davidzon is a nonresident fellow with the Atlantic Council at the Eurasia Center and is the author of From Odessa with Love, a novel about modern Odessa. He is known for his daily practice of keeping an artistic  daybook/diary and also for his work as a collage artist.
In March 2022 he burned his Russian passport in front of the Russian embassy in Paris with former Estonian President Toomas Hendrik Ilves holding the lighter.

Early life and education
Davidzon was born in Tashkent, then capital of the Uzbek Soviet Socialist Republic, on March 7, 1985, to a family of Jewish origin. His grandfather was active in the republic's liberalizing political arena and was assassinated. Davidzon moved with his family to Moscow before emigrating to New York City in 1991. His father, Grigory Davidzon, became a "kingmaker" and entrepreneur in the Russophone community of Brighton Beach.

Davidzon went on to study English literature at City University of New York. During that time, he was an aide to renowned violinist Nina Beilina. At CUNY was a student of political theorist Marshall Barman as well as Literary Critic Morris Dickstein and poet Matvei Yankelevich.
He studied Human Rights Law at the EIUC in Venice, Italy.

Author
In 2011, Davidzon moved to Odessa, Ukraine, where he wrote dispatches on topics relating to the social and cultural landscape of the city. After the Maidan Revolution, Davidzon founded The Odessa Review, which served as an anglophone platform for this subject. Davidzon's experience in interacting with various local and national politicians and intellectuals were compiled into a collection of essays in his book, From Odessa With Love.

Award 

2022 Transatlantic Leadership Network Freedom of the Media Award for the best Next Generation Journalism Reporting

Journalist
Davidzon has resided in Paris since leaving Odessa, serving as the correspondent for Tablet Magazine. Davidzon writes as a freelancer on issues that concern European politics and cultural affairs and their intersection with Jewish culture. In 2020, Davidzon was approached by Ukrainian operatives connected to the campaign of President Donald Trump, with offers to propagate news relating to Hunter Biden's laptop. 
According to CNN "Davidzon said he did not act on the offer, letting it go “as elegantly as possible.” But - he shared what he knew with US authorities".

In 2021, Davidzon collaborated with Bernard Henri-Levy to publish an anthology of writings relating to Ukrainian-Jewish affairs.

Currently, Davidzon is reporting from Ukraine on the 2022 Russian invasion of Ukraine on behalf of Tablet Magazine and Foreign Policy Magazine.

On the night before the Russian invasion began on February 24,2022 Davidzon had dinner in Kyiv with his friend the Latvian American investor Dan Rapoport who would die several months in Washington D.C. under suspicious circumstances.

Davidzon worked as a producer on actor Sean Penn`s Ukraine war documentary "Superpower" and traveled with Penn producing the film and interpreting during some of Penn`s meetings with Ukrainian officials.

Personal life 

During his studies in Paris in his late twenties Davidzon met his future wife, the Franco-Ukrainian Film Producer Regina Maryanovska-Davidzon. He is a descendant of the Soviet Composer Isaac Dunaevsky.

Davidzon is a self-identified Judeo-Banderite.

References 

1985 births
Living people
People from Brighton Beach
Writers from Odesa
Writers from Tashkent
Writers from Brooklyn
Writers from Moscow
Russian emigrants to the United States
Russian expatriates in Ukraine
Jewish Russian writers
21st-century Russian journalists